is a fictional superhero and the protagonist of One's manga series One-Punch Man. Saitama, an unassociated hero, hails from Z-City and performs heroic deeds as a hobby. For three years, he has trained enough to defeat any enemy with a single punch, his unmatched strength leaving him bored. He becomes a reluctant mentor to Genos, a cyborg seeking revenge against another cyborg who killed his family and destroyed his hometown, after Saitama defeats a monster that defeated Genos. With Genos, Saitama learns about a heroes organization who are also fighting the monsters.

The character was created by One as part of a webcomic involving an alternate style of superhero who already started as the strongest one in the world and most of his stories involved daily chores. For the manga serialization, Saitama was illustrated by Yusuke Murata.

The character has been voiced by Makoto Furukawa in Japanese and Max Mittelman in English. Saitama has been a popular character, often acclaimed by the fandom of being the strongest character in anime history.

Creation
Manga author One became interested in creating a comic superhero who was already the strongest in the world. He wanted to focus on different aspects of storytelling than those normally relied on in standard superhero stories, such as everyday problems. ONE said: "Punching is oftentimes pretty useless against life's problems. But inside One-Punch Mans universe, I made Saitama a sort of guy who was capable of adapting his life to the world that surrounded him, only armed with his immense power. The only obstacles he faces are mundane things, like running short of money."

The idea was that the super hero became bored and instead dealt with daily chores. In One's point of view, a hero is not cool for being strong or strength. Instead, it is the mentality of Saitama and how he is able to understand other people's mentalities. The idea was that the super hero became bored and instead dealt with daily chores. One felt difficulties in drawing scenarios for Saitama due to how overpowered he was. In Saitama's case, all he have to do is have him show up to punch the problem away. In the world Saitama lives in, monsters show up frequently, so he gets to utilize his strength to the fullest, so he can feel comfortable making the plot. If anything happens, the author can always count on Saitama. The story will be interesting as long as he's on the move. The only hard part is to make his allies seem not too weak.

Artist Yusuke Murata initially drew him "cool" alongside the entire cast. In that process he was making Saitama look handsome, or adding stars in his eyes, but all of these ideas were scrapped. In the end, those things did not fit Saitama's nature. He changed it since One's ideas of Saitama was the complete opposite. Nevertheless, he had fun when drawing the character. The idea of the blank expression Saitama tends to make were done intentionally for comedic effect. Murata also elaborated that while it is hard to relate to overpowered characters in fiction, the way One wrote Saitama managed to give this theme.

Casting

Saitama is voiced by Makoto Furukawa in the Japanese version and by Max Mittelman in the English dub. Furukawa first learned of the series thanks to a friends who had the manga. He felt that the story, in which each episode is completed in a short number of episodes, and that Saitama always finishes with a quick blow to defeat the enemy at the end, is simple yet very interesting. Additionally, his first impression of Saitama was so strong that he was worried about whether he would be able to play it. He was surprised that he was really the strongest hero because the gap between his daily life and fighting was appealing. Furukawa called him "complex" due to his lack of motivation and not being attentive enough while his chores are part of what make him charm which made him relatable. The actor explained that Saitama has two different tone based on the scenes he is involved making him both cool and uncool.

Mittelman was attracted by the series' first episode and found hilarious how Saitama dresses in contrast to the menacing villains. In getting the role, he wanted to make sure he got appropriate balance between being bored but not lazy and "a little detached". He expressed difficulties in emulating Furukawa, claiming his performance would come as "crazy" due to the differences between the Japanese and the English versions.

Appearances
Saitama is a bald-headed 25-year-old  man who is bored of fighting because he is able to effortlessly defeat enemies with a single punch. He lives in an apartment in City Z. Three years prior to the start of the series, when he still had hair, Saitama was job hunting when he defeated the powerful supervillain Crablante that attempted to kill a child with a butt-chin. Saitama says he became a hero "for the fun of it". His abilities mainly consist of physical abilities magnified to an immeasurable degree: strength is the true power of Saitama, with speed, stamina, and durability being mere side-effects. He attributes this to a daily training regimen (100 push-ups, 100 sit-ups, 100 squats, a 10 km run, eating healthy food, and abstaining from use of the air conditioner or heater in order to reinforce his mental fortitude.) (He also mentions training even when his body was wounded and made strange cracking sounds). Three years of this spartan training pushed Saitama to his limits, making him evidently unbeatable. Early in the series, he picks up a disciple and roommate, Genos.

Though he had broken all the physical records in the Hero entrance exam by huge margins, Saitama enters the Hero Association with a score of 71, giving him one of the lowest ranks in the Hero Association. This is due to his miserable performance on the mental exam. He soon goes up the ranks by performing many deeds, although many of his efforts are not recognized because of collateral damage or higher-tiered superheroes receiving more credit. These include defeating the raging ninja supervillain/assassin known as Speed-o’-Sound Sonic (who became his unlikely rival) and destroying a meteor similar to Chicxulub, each with a single punch. As of the current arc of the webcomic by ONE, he is A-Class rank 39. Regardless of his rank, he does not mind giving others the credit, as demonstrated in his actions following the fight against the Deep Sea King. In the Dark Matter Thieves' story arc, he is unfazed by the telekinesis of a powerful esper, further displaying his resistance. This arc was also one of the only times he has used his "serious punch", defeating the world-conquering leader of the aliens, Lord Boros. It was also revealed that Saitama's power can continue to grow limitless as demonstrated during his fight with Cosmic Garou, with the latter leaving him behind on the power scaling through every blows exchanged. Through various circumstances, he forms friendships with Mumen Rider, Bang, King, and Blizzard.

The character is also featured in One-Punch Man: A Hero Nobody Knows video game.

Reception

Popularity
Saitama ranked first in a popularity poll from the manga. In Animax Carnival Malaysia 2016, an attraction of the series where the guest was challenged to punch harder than the character. Several types of merchandising were also created. In 2019, a Singaporean man named known as Seah replicated Saitama's workout he mentions early in the series to become fit, showing positive results in the process.

Critical reception 
Critical response to Saitama has been mostly positive. Anime News Network enjoyed his early chapters and his relationship with Genos for how hilarious the duo are. For the series, Den of Geek commented the series' biggest appeal were not the fight scenes but instead Saitama's comical scenes whenever he is disappointed with a villain which act as a satire from fighting series. However, the first season's ending was praised for mixing both elements of the narrative into two episodes where Saitama makes a dull expression before becoming serious in a fight for the first time. IGN agreed stating the series does a fine job at how Saitama properly ends most of his fights in a different fashion.

Comic Book Resources praised chapter 165 as it portrayed Saitama at his biggest which several readers have always been looking forward to though there is no sense of happiness to his feats. SportsKeeda listed Saitama as the series' strongest character twice but wondered if the recently introduced character, God, might be able to defeat the title character. ScreenRant also listed Saitama as the strongest character in anime history. SportsKeeda noted several fandoms tend to be split on who is the strongest character in two series: Saitama or Goku from Dragon Ball. Anime News Network compared Saitama with All Might, a famous character from the manga series, My Hero Academia among Western superheroes, stating that despite their similar concepts, the narrative is far different. Nevertheless, the writer said that all of them give the idea of selfimprovement to the fans. Furukawa's performance as Saitama was also praised.

Panic at the Discourse writer Joe Yang stated that when Saitama defeats the monster Deep Sea King, he sacrifices his own reputation by not taking credit as he "upholds the ideology of the hero's association" giving depths of to reflex in how heroes are recognized in fiction. Yang expressed contrast between Saitama and the Marvel heroes and instead compared him with anime heroes like Naruto Uzumaki, Goku, Ichigo Kurosaki, among others as they do not act like heroes neither. Yang placed emphasis on Saitama's origins as a failed "salaryman masculinity" common in the Showa era as well as how he is not approved by Hero Association as an important hero by society. In concluding, Yang believes that One wrote Saitama as an example of salarymen.

References

External links
  

One-Punch Man
Anime and manga characters who can move at superhuman speeds
Anime and manga characters with superhuman strength
Comics characters introduced in 2009
Fictional boxers
Fictional characters with superhuman durability or invulnerability
Fictional monster hunters
Fictional unemployed people
Male characters in anime and manga
Male superheroes
Parody superheroes
Superheroes in anime and manga
Vigilante characters in comics